In aviation, uncontrolled airspace is airspace in which an Air Traffic Control (ATC) service is not deemed necessary or cannot be provided for practical reasons.  It is the opposite of controlled airspace.  It is that portion of the airspace that has not been designated as Control Area, Control Zone, Terminal Control Area or Transition Area.

According to the airspace classes set by the International Civil Aviation Organization (ICAO), the uncontrolled classes of airspace are class F and G.

Class F 
Class F (uncontrolled) is rarely encountered in ICAO member-states' airspace systems. In the UK, it was formerly a hybrid between class E (controlled) and G (uncontrolled) as Advisory Routes (ADRs). In the UK, all airspace previously designated as class F was re-assigned to either class E or G on 13 November 2014.

Class G 
Individual countries designate different portions of airspace as class G, e.g. in the UK, airspace above FL660 (Flight Level 660 or 66,000 feet) is uncontrolled and belonging to class G, while in the US, any airspace above FL600 (60,000 feet) is designated as class E and therefore controlled. Similarly, large parts of lower airspace in the UK are uncontrolled while in the US any airspace above 700-1200 feet up to FL145 (14,500 feet), not designated as any other class of airspace (A-D) belongs to class E and is controlled.

Air traffic control 
ATC does not exercise any executive authority in uncontrolled airspace, but may provide basic information services to aircraft in radio contact.  The aircraft commencing its flight in uncontrolled airspace, and subsequently proceeding into controlled airspace, should obtain clearance from the ATC unit in whose area the controlled part will begin. If a flight starts in controlled airspace but its subsequent portion will be uncontrolled, its clearance should be up to the point at which the controlled portion of the flight terminates. 

Flight in uncontrolled airspace will typically be under VFR.  Aircraft operating under IFR should not expect separation from other traffic; however, in certain uncontrolled airspace, this might be provided on an 'as far as is practical' advisory basis. Controlled flights should not be vectored (directed) by ATC into uncontrolled airspace except for weather avoidance or in an emergency.

References

Air traffic control